Thuppanadupuzha River is a river in India. It is one of the tributaries of the river Thuthapuzha. Thuthapuzha is one of the main  tributaries of the Bharathapuzha River, the second-longest river in Kerala, south India.

Thuppanadupuzha originates from the Kalladikodan hills which is 1099 metres high and is a part of the palakkad hills along the northern lip of the Palakkad gap. Thuppanadupuzha joins the Thoothapuzha, which in turn empties into Bharathapuzha. Thuppanadupuzha runs close to Chenath nair reserve forest.

See also
Bharathapuzha - Main river
Thuthapuzha - One of the main  tributaries of the river Bharathapuzha

Other tributaries of the river Thuthapuzha
Kunthipuzha
Kanjirappuzha
Ambankadavu

References

Rivers of Palakkad district
Bharathappuzha